The Oude Molen (English:Old Mill) or Molen van Houben (English: Houben's Mill) is a watermill located on the Oude Molenweg 6 in Simpelveld, Netherlands. Build in 1774 along the Eyserbeek river, the watermill functioned as gristmill until the 1960s. During this time it was restored several times. In 1960 the mill stopped functioning, and a year later the land upstream was disowned by the local government. Currently it functions as housing.

The mill is a national monument (nr 33593). Of the original mill only the millhouse and the iron breastshot water wheel, with corresponding flume, remain.

Gallery

See also 
 Bulkemsmolen

Watermills in the Netherlands
Watermills in Limburg (Netherlands)
Rijksmonuments in Simpelveld